The Kodar Mountains are a mountain range in the Transbaikal region of Siberia, Russia. The name Kodar is derived from "khada", an Evenki word for rock.

The range is part of the Udokan Ore Region that includes the Kalar and Udokan ranges.

Geography
The Kodar Mountains are part of the Stanovoy Highlands, which range from the northern tip of Lake Baikal to the Olyokma River. The Northern Muya Range rises at the western end and the Delyun-Uran Range to the northwest. Lying within the Baikal Rift Zone, the area is prone to earthquakes. The range is bounded by the Vitim and Chara rivers, both tributaries of the Lena. To the north and northeast it borders with the Olyokma-Chara Plateau —in the upper reaches of the Chara river. The Apsat River flows through the range.

The Kodar range is the highest in the Transbaikal region with its tallest peak, Pik BAM (Baikal Amur Magistral), rising . According to a 2013 study, the range contains 34 glaciers. The glaciers are small, at most  in length.

The area experiences a subarctic climate, with the Siberian High resulting in very low temperatures and precipitation from November to March. Although snow can occur any time of year, 80 percent falls in late Spring and early Autumn.

See also
Chara Sands
Lake Oron
List of mountains and hills of Russia
List of ultras of Northeast Asia

References

External links

Mountain ranges of Russia
Stanovoy Highlands